Rozelle Bay is a bay located to the south of Glebe Island and the west of Blackwattle Bay, on Sydney Harbour. 

The naming of the bay is derived from either the Rosella bird or the Rosella plant, with the latter being more likely, due to the other names in the area that have botanic origins.

A light rail station on the Dulwich Hill Line is named after the bay.

Rozelle Bay is fed by Johnstons Creek and Whites Creek.

The dockyard of the Sydney Heritage Fleet is located on the western shore of Rozelle Bay.

Gallery

References

Bays of New South Wales
Sydney Harbour
Inner West